Pit No. 6 Dam or Pit 6 Dam is a hydroelectric dam on the Pit River in northern California. Its power station generates up to 79 MW.

The dam, built in 1965, is owned by the Pacific Gas and Electric Company.

See also

List of dams and reservoirs in California
List of lakes in California

References

Dams in California
Dams on the Pit River
Gravity dams
Hydroelectric power plants in California
Pacific Gas and Electric Company dams
Buildings and structures in Shasta County, California
Dams completed in 1965
Energy infrastructure completed in 1965
1965 establishments in California